The Bangladesh Jatiyo Sarmik Jote (translation: Bangladesh National Workers Alliance) is a national trade union federation in Bangladesh. It is affiliated with the World Federation of Trade Unions.

References

National trade union centres of Bangladesh
World Federation of Trade Unions
Organisations based in Dhaka